Acer paxii is an Asian species of maple. It has been found only in southwestern China (Guangxi, Guizhou, Sichuan, Yunnan).

Acer paxii is an evergreen tree up to 15 meters tall, with brown bark. Leaves are non-compound, leathery, up to 11 cm wide and 6 cm across, toothless, sometimes unlobed but sometimes with 3 shallow lobes.

References

External links
line drawing for Flora of China drawing 2 at bottom

paxii
Plants described in 1887
Flora of China